Spirals of Silence is the debut studio album by American musician Angelo De Augustine.

Critical reception

Roger Valença of Monkeybuzz said that "the eleven tracks that add up to just over half an hour compose a delicate and emotional experience, very quiet, which will make fans of the “voice and guitar” genre very happy". Writing for Austin Town Hall, Nathan Lankfork praised the record: "I encourage you to do your own exploration of the record, as each time I spin it, I find something different and new lurking in the background, or even in front of my face. It’s a record that’ll make you lost, looking for the key to its secrets, and in the end, it’s just a nice bit of songwriting".

Track listing

Personnel
Performance
 Angelo De Augustine – vocals

References 

2014 debut albums
Angelo De Augustine albums